Ulrika (Ulla) Eleonora Matilda Procopé-Nyman (1921–1968) was a Finnish designer of ceramics. Procopé was one of the most noted Finnish ceramic designers of the Golden Age of Finnish Design. Her work has been produced by the Arabia company in Finland.

Procopé's parents were Lieutenant Colonel  (1876–1956), the commander of the Finnish White Guard (1919–1928), and his wife, Karin Maria née Spåre (1885–1924).

Procopé graduated from the School of Arts and Crafts (later known as the Aalto School of Arts) in Helsinki in 1948 and entered the Arabia ceramics factory directly after graduating. She continued to work for Arabia until 1966. Procopé specialised in creating practical ceramics designs and decorations for daily use.

Procopé is most noted for her cobalt blue hand-painted Valencia series, which was designed in 1960 and remained in production until 2002. The design was influenced by Southern European ceramics, which Procopé was introduced to since her youth. She lived in Southern France by the Spanish border as a young girl, and after retiring went to live in the Canary Islands until her death. She is also noted for designing many series using stoneware, such as the Arabia Ruska (autumn colours), Anemone, Rosmarin, and Meri (sea) series.

Gallery

References

External links
 

1921 births
1968 deaths
Finnish potters
Finnish designers
Finnish ceramists
Women potters
20th-century Finnish women artists
Finnish women ceramists
20th-century ceramists